"The Miracle of Love" is a power ballad recorded by British duo Eurythmics. It was written by Eurythmics members Annie Lennox and David A. Stewart and produced by Stewart. The track was released as the third single from the duo's sixth album Revenge in the UK. It was not released as a single in the United States.

The music video was directed by band member David A. Stewart. The grainy video shows Lennox and Stewart separately in darkened room surrounded only by candles followed by a shot of Lennox against a tree while historical footage of military violence is shown. The video ends with an extreme close-up of Lennox as she wanders around a park before acknowledging the camera by winking, smiling and laughing. The cover art for the single is a screenshot from this scene. The music features a soaring guitar solo by Stewart, reprising the melody of the opening bars.

The song became a modest hit on the UK Singles Chart but reached the top 20 in Australia, Brazil and parts of Europe.
In a review of Revenge, Glenn O'Brian of Spin magazine called it "a miraculous love song that is heavenly, seductive, sweeping, anodynamic, and straightforwardly, blatantly healing."

Track listing

7" single
A: "The Miracle of Love" - 5:05
B: "When Tomorrow Comes" (Live at the Roxy in Los Angeles) - 5:08

12" single
A: "The Miracle of Love" - 5:05
B1: "When Tomorrow Comes" (Live at the Roxy in Los Angeles) - 5:08
B2 "Who's That Girl?" (Live on Rockline 21 July 1986) - 3:28*

*later released on the 2005 remaster of Touch

Charts

References 

1986 songs
1986 singles
Eurythmics songs
Songs written by David A. Stewart
Songs written by Annie Lennox
Song recordings produced by Dave Stewart (musician and producer)
RCA Records singles